The Soyuz (meaning "union", GRAU index 11A511) was a Soviet expendable carrier rocket designed in the 1960s by OKB-1 and manufactured by State Aviation Plant No. 1 in Kuybyshev, Soviet Union. It was commissioned to launch Soyuz spacecraft as part of the Soviet human spaceflight program, first with 8 uncrewed test flights, followed by the first 19 crewed launches. The original Soyuz also propelled four test flights of the improved Soyuz 7K-T capsule between 1972 and 1974. In total it flew 30 successful missions over 10 years and suffered two failures.

The Soyuz 11A511 type, a member of the R-7 family of rockets, first flew in 1966. Derived from the Voskhod 11A57 type, It was a two-stage rocket, with four liquid-fuelled strap-on boosters clustered around the first stage, with a Block I second stage. The first four test launches were all failures, but eventually it worked. The new, uprated core stage and strap-ons became standard for all R-7 derived launch vehicles to replace the numerous older variants in use on the 8A92, 11A57, and 8K78M types. While the original Blok I stage as developed in 1960 used RD-107 engines, the Soyuz boosters instead had RD-110s, which were more powerful as necessitated by the heavier weight of the Soyuz craft and also had several design improvements to increase reliability and safety on crewed missions. The Molniya 8K78M booster also adopted the RD-110 during 1965, but Voskhod boosters continued using the older RD-107.

Starting in 1973, the original Soyuz rocket was gradually superseded by the Soyuz-U derivative type, which became the world's most prolific launcher, flying hundreds of missions over 43 years until its retirement scheduled for 2016. Other direct variants were Soyuz-L for low Earth orbit tests of the LK lunar lander (3 flights) and Soyuz-M built for a quickly abandoned military spacecraft and used for reconnaissance satellites instead (8 flights).

The aborted Soyuz 18-1 launch in 1975 was the final crewed flight of the 11A511 and as it occurred shortly before the ASTP mission, the United States requested that the Soviets provide details about this failure. They stated that Soyuz 19 would be using the newer 11A5511U booster model (i.e. Soyuz-U) so that the Soyuz 18-1 malfunction had no bearing on it.

Soyuz rockets were assembled horizontally in the MIK Building at the launch site. The rocket was then rolled out, and erected on the launch pad.

References

1966 in spaceflight
1976 in spaceflight
R-7 (rocket family)
Soyuz program
Space launch vehicles of the Soviet Union
Vehicles introduced in 1966